Gornja Oraovica is a village in central Croatia, in the municipality of Dvor, Sisak-Moslavina County.

Demographics
According to the 2011 census, the village of Gornja Oraovica 
has 36 inhabitants. This represents 31.58% of its pre-war population according to the 1991 census.

The 1991 census recorded that 98.25% of the village population were ethnic Serbs (112/114) and 1.75% were of other/unknown ethnic origin (2/114).

References

Populated places in Sisak-Moslavina County
Serb communities in Croatia